Meat Light is a 3CD compilation of Frank Zappa's Uncle Meat recordings. It is project/object #5 in a series of 40th Anniversary FZ Audio Documentaries, following MOFO (2006), Lumpy Money (2009), Greasy Love Songs (2010) and The Crux of the Biscuit (2016).

The album includes the original 1969 vinyl mix of "Uncle Meat" (without the film dialogue and "Tengo Na Minchia Tanta" which were added on the CD release in 1987), followed by the originally planned sequence of the tracks (which includes different edits and a longer version of the track "Cops & Buns" from The Lost Episodes) and outtakes.

Track listing

Personnel 
 Frank Zappa — guitar, vocals, percussion
 Ray Collins — vocals
 Jimmy Carl Black — drums
 Roy Estrada — electric bass, falsetto
 Don Preston — electric piano
 Billy Mundi — drums on some pieces
 Bunk Gardner — piccolo, flute, clarinet, bass clarinet, soprano sax, alto sax, tenor sax, bassoon
 Ian Underwood — electric organ, piano, harpsichord, celeste, flute, clarinet, alto sax, baritone sax
 Art Tripp — drums, timpani, vibes, marimba, xylophone, wood blocks, bells, small chimes
 Euclid James Sherwood — tenor sax, tambourine
 Ruth Komanoff — marimba, vibes
 Nelcy Walker — vocals on "Dog Breath" and "The Uncle Meat Variations"
 Theodore Holdt — cover art

References 

Frank Zappa compilation albums
2016 compilation albums
Compilation albums published posthumously